A peripheral blood mononuclear cell (PBMC) is any peripheral blood cell having a round nucleus. These cells consist of lymphocytes (T cells, B cells, NK cells) and monocytes, whereas erythrocytes and platelets have no nuclei, and granulocytes (neutrophils, basophils, and eosinophils) have multi-lobed nuclei. In humans, lymphocytes make up the majority of the PBMC population, followed by monocytes, and only a small percentage of dendritic cells. 

These cells can be extracted from whole blood using ficoll, a hydrophilic polysaccharide that separates layers of blood, and gradient centrifugation, which will separate the blood into a top layer of plasma, followed by a layer of PBMCs and a bottom fraction of polymorphonuclear cells (such as neutrophils and eosinophils) and erythrocytes. The polymorphonuclear cells can be further isolated by lysing the red blood cells. Basophils are sometimes found in both the denser and the PBMC fractions.

Clinical significance

Infections
Recent studies indicate that PBMCs may be susceptible to pathogenic infections, such as Ureaplasma parvum and urealiticum, Mycoplasma genitalium and hominis and Chlamydia trachomatis infections. PBMCs may be also susceptible to viral infections. Indeed, footprints of JC polyomavirus and Merkel cell polyomavirus have been detected in PBMCs from pregnant women and women affected by spontaneous abortion.

Research uses 
Many scientists conducting research in the fields of immunology (including auto-immune disorders), infectious disease, hematological malignancies, vaccine development, transplant immunology, and high-throughput screening are frequent users of PBMCs. In many cases, PBMCs are derived from blood banks. PBMC fraction also contains progenitor populations, as demonstrated by methylcellulose based colony forming assays. 

PBMCs have been thought to be an important route of vaccination. PBMCs from cancer patients can be extracted and cultured in vitro. Subsequently, PBMCs are challenged with tumor antigens such as tumor stem cell antigen. Inflammatory cytokines are usually added to aid in antigen uptake and recognition by PBMCs.

See also 
 Peripheral blood cell

References

Leukocytes